Kim Jung-hwan (born November 23, 1990), known professionally as Eddy Kim, is a South Korean singer, songwriter, and guitarist. He rose to fame as a contestant on the television talent show Superstar K 4 in 2012. He released his first EP, The Manual, in 2014.

On April 5, 2019, Kim was booked by the police for circulating illegally taken pictures of women in the Jung Joon-young KakaoTalk chatrooms, a mobile chat with fellow celebrities in 2016; a police investigation is ongoing into the Burning Sun scandal. On April 11, 2019, he admitted to spreading hidden camera photos taken without consent which he had downloaded from the internet.

Discography

Extended plays

Singles

Other releases

Filmography

Variety shows

Awards and nominations

Mnet Asian Music Awards 

|-
| rowspan="2"| 2014 
| rowspan="2"|Eddy Kim
|Best New Artist
| 
|-
| Union Pay Artist of the Year
|

Seoul Music Awards 

|-
| 2015
| Eddy Kim
|Best New Artist
|

Chatroom Controversy Involving Jung Joon-young 
On April 4, 2019, MBC's "Newsdesk" reported that Eddy Kim was one of the members in a group chat where Jung Joon-young shared illicit videos of him having sex with other women without their consent. Mystic Entertainment revealed later that day that Eddy Kim was in fact in the chatroom, but denied that he was involved in the filming or spreading of the footage.

On March 6, 2020, all charges against Eddy Kim were dropped by the Seoul Central District Prosecutors' Office because the singer had only shared a photo he found online (on one occasion), and did not directly film nor distribute the illicit footage of the women. Additionally, the chatroom where he shared the photo was revealed as not the chatroom where Jung Joon Young shared the illicit footage, but just a group chat for hobbies.

References

External links

1990 births
Living people
K-pop singers
South Korean rhythm and blues singers
South Korean pop guitarists
South Korean rhythm and blues guitarists
Berklee College of Music alumni
Superstar K participants
Singers from Seoul
Mystic Entertainment artists
21st-century South Korean  male singers
21st-century guitarists
The Lovett School alumni
South Korean male singer-songwriters